Mount Bellamy is a mountain in the Owen Stanley Range in south-eastern Papua New Guinea. The mountain rises to 2,250 metres (7,400 ft).

Bellamy